Kim Jin-kyu (16 April 1922 – 18 June 1998) was a South Korean actor, film director and producer.

Personal life
He had two children, Kim Jin-ah and Kim Jin-geun who both became actors.

Filmography 
*Note; the whole list is referenced.

Director

Light

Awards 
 1964, the 2nd Blue Dragon Film Awards : Best Actor and Best Favorite Actor for The Extra Mortals
 1965, the 1st Baeksang Arts Awards : Best Film Actor (벙어리 삼룡)
 1966, the 4th Blue Dragon Film Awards : Best Favorite Actor
 1966, the 5th Grand Bell Awards : Best Actor for The Sun Rises Again (Taeyangeun Dasi Tteunda)
 1967, the 3rd Baeksang Arts Awards : Best Film Actor
 1975, the 14th Grand Bell Awards : Best Supporting Actor for A Road to Sampo (Sampoganeun gil)
 1975, the 11th Baeksang Arts Awards : Best Film Actor for A story of crazy painter (Gwanghwasa)
 1977, the 16th Grand Bell Awards : Best Actor for A War Diary (Nanjung ilgi)
 1986, the 25th Grand Bell Awards : 86 Yeonghwainsang

See also
Cinema of Korea

References

External links 

1922 births
1998 deaths
South Korean film directors
South Korean film producers
20th-century South Korean male actors
South Korean male film actors
South Korean male television actors
Grand Prize Paeksang Arts Award (Film) winners